Taejon Broadcasting Corporation or TJB (also known as True Joy Begins) is a regional television and radio broadcasting company based in Daejeon. The station is an affiliate of the SBS Network. Eventually, it was originally established on April 9, 1994, although it began its official broadcast on May 15, 1995.

Stations

 Television
Channel - Ch. 15 (LCN 6)
Launched - May 14, 1995
Affiliated to - SBS
Call Sign - HLDF-DTV
 FM radio (TJB Power FM)
Frequency - FM 95.7 MHz (Daejeon), FM 96.5 MHz (Seosan)
Launched - March 2, 1998 (Daejeon)January 1, 2002 (Seosan)
Affiliated to - SBS Power FM
Call Sign - HLDF-FM

See also
SBS (Korea)

External links
 

Seoul Broadcasting System affiliates
Television channels and stations established in 1994
Radio stations established in 1994
Mass media in Daejeon